Walton County is located on the Emerald Coast in the northwestern part of the U.S. state of Florida, with its southern border on the Gulf of Mexico. As of the 2020 census, the population was 75,305. Its county seat is DeFuniak Springs. Walton County is included in the Crestview–Fort Walton Beach–Destin Metropolitan Statistical Area.

History

Walton County was organized by European Americans in 1824.  It was named for Colonel George Walton Jr., secretary of the Florida Territory from 1821 to 1826. Walton, the son of George Walton, a signer of the Declaration of Independence, was born 15 August 1786 in Augusta, Georgia, and died 20 March 1859 in Petersburg, Virginia.

Between 1763 and 1783 the territory that has since become Walton County was part of the colony of British West Florida.  During this time British settlers permanently settled in the area, becoming the first English-speaking people to permanently reside in what is now Walton County.  During this period Scottish settlers migrated from the backcountry of the Carolinas and settled in the Defuniak Springs area while English settlers, most of whom were either farmers or fishermen, settled in the southern portion of the county by the sea, settling throughout the area that has since become Santa Rosa Beach, Sandestin, Miramar Beach, Point Washington, Seaside and Topsail Hill Preserve State Park and Point Washington State Forest.

While the Scottish settlers had come from a recently established Scottish-majority settlement in North Carolina, the English settlers came largely from the English regions of Norfolk, Dorset and the western half of Sussex.  Both the Scots village in the northern portion of the county and the English community along the coast were largely self-contained and had economies that were entirely operational without external trade, as all products in use were made within the two respective communities, and the only external trade was between the Scots in Defuniak Springs and the English farmers/fishermen by the coast.  Neither community exported the goods they produced for profit, nor did they have any imported goods at all as both communities relied on self-produced subsistence agriculture. The original settlements were in the Euchee (Yuchi) Valley, near the landing on the Choctawhatchee River that was maintained by a mixed-race Yuchi named Sam Story, whose mother was Yuchi and father was an early Scots trader in the area. The white settlers founded one of the first Presbyterian churches in Northwest Florida. It is still an operating parish and has a historical cemetery.

When the Spanish regained control of Florida in 1783, roughly two-thirds of the British settlers in Pensacola left the colony to find permanent habitation elsewhere, including in the Bahamas and Bermuda, however none of the English or Scottish settlers in what has since become Walton County left with them.  The Spanish came to regard the English and Scottish settlers in what has since become Walton County as "stubborn" and "ungovernable" as the Spanish were unable to make them obey Spanish law.  They unanimously refused to convert to Catholicism, despite the fact that Spanish law said they were only allowed to remain in Florida if they did so and the Spanish were unable to compel them to pay taxes to the local Spanish government.  As settlers from the newly created United States of America began migrating into north Florida the English and Scottish settlers in what has since become Walton County became gradually absorbed into this community, which would subsequently become the majority population in North Florida.

In 1860, there were roughly 573 military aged men in Walton County. Of that population, 62, or 11%, went to serve in the Union unit, the 1st Florida Cavalry Regiment that was mustered in on October 29, 1863.

Geography

The county is one of the largest in area in the state, stretching from the Alabama state line to the Emerald Coast.

Adjacent counties

 Covington County, Alabama – northwest
 Geneva County, Alabama – northeast
 Holmes County – east
 Washington County – east
 Bay County – southeast
 Okaloosa County – west

National protected areas

 Choctawhatchee National Forest (part)
 Point Washington State Forest   (part)

Demographics

As of the 2020 United States census, there were 75,305 people, 28,635 households, and 20,034 families residing in the county.

As of the census of 2000, there were 40,601 people, 16,548 households, and 11,120 families residing in the county.  The population density was 38 people per square mile (15/km2).  There were 29,083 housing units at an average density of 28 per square mile (11/km2).  The racial makeup of the county was 88.41% White, 6.98% Black or African American, 1.28% Native American, 0.45% Asian, 0.04% Pacific Islander, 0.75% from other races, and 2.09% from two or more races.  2.17% of the population were Hispanic or Latino of any race.

There were 16,548 households, out of which 26.40% had children under the age of 18 living with them, 53.00% were married couples living together, 10.10% had a female householder with no husband present, and 32.80% were non-families. 27.10% of all households were made up of individuals, and 10.10% had someone living alone who was 65 years of age or older.  The average household size was 2.35 and the average family size was 2.83.

In the county, the population was spread out, with 21.70% under the age of 18, 7.10% from 18 to 24, 28.50% from 25 to 44, 26.90% from 45 to 64, and 15.80% who were 65 years of age or older.  The median age was 40 years. For every 100 females there were 105.20 males.  For every 100 females age 18 and over, there were 105.00 males.

The median income for a household in the county was $32,407, and the median income for a family was $37,663. Males had a median income of $26,799 versus $21,208 for females. The per capita income for the county was $18,198.  About 11.60% of families and 14.40% of the population were below the poverty line, including 21.00% of those under age 18 and 10.90% of those age 65 or over.

Government

County government

Politics

Libraries

Walton County has 4 branches, including the historic DeFuniak Springs Library.
 Coastal Branch Library
 DeFuniak Springs Library
 Freeport
 Gladys N. Milton Memorial Library

Schools

The county is served by the Walton County School District.

Elementary schools 

 Bay School, Santa Rosa Beach
 Dune Lakes Elementary, Santa Rosa Beach
 Freeport Elementary, Freeport
 Maude Saunders Elementary School, DeFuniak Springs
 Mossy Head Elementary, Mossy Head
 Van R. Butler Elementary, Santa Rosa Beach
 West DeFuniak Elementary, DeFuniak Springs

Middle schools 

 Emerald Coast Middle School, Santa Rosa Beach
 Freeport Middle School, Freeport
 Walton Middle School, DeFuniak Springs

High schools 

 Freeport High School, Freeport
 South Walton High School, Santa Rosa Beach
 Walton High School, DeFuniak Springs

K–12 

 Paxton School, Paxton

Charter schools 

 Walton Academy, DeFuniak Springs
 Seaside Neighborhood School, Seaside
 Seacoast Collegiate High School, Seaside

Communities

Cities

 DeFuniak Springs
 Freeport

Town

 Paxton

Census-designated place

 Miramar Beach

Other unincorporated communities

 Alys Beach
 Argyle
 Blue Mountain Beach
 Bruce
 Darlington
 Eucheanna (Euchee Valley)
 Glendale
 Grayton Beach
 Inlet Beach
 Liberty
 Mossy Head
 Red Bay
 Rosemary Beach
 Santa Rosa Beach
 Seacrest
 Seagrove
 Seaside

Gallery

Transportation

Airports

 DeFuniak Springs Airport

Highways

  Interstate 10
  US Highway 90
  US Highway 98
  US Highway 331
  Florida State Road 20
  Florida State Road 30A
  Florida State Road 81
  Florida State Road 83

Notable people

 Sean Dietrich, writer
 Mary Vinson, artist

See also

 National Register of Historic Places listings in Walton County, Florida
 Nokuse Plantation

Notes

References

External links

Government links/Constitutional offices

 Walton County Board of County Commissioners
 Walton County Supervisor of Elections
 Walton County Property Appraiser
 Walton County Sheriff's Office
 Walton County Tax Collector

Special districts

 Walton County School District
 Northwest Florida Water Management District
 South Walton Fire District

Judicial branch

 Walton County Clerk of Courts
  Public Defender, 1st Judicial Circuit of Florida serving Escambia, Santa Rosa, Okaloosa, and Walton counties
  Office of the State Attorney, 1st Judicial Circuit of Florida
  Circuit and County Court for the 1st Judicial Circuit of Florida

Media links

 Walton Outdoors
 Northwest Florida Daily News
 SoWal.com
 Waltonsun.com
 wmbb.com
 Coastal Dune Lakes

 
Florida counties
1824 establishments in Florida Territory
Populated places established in 1824
North Florida